Bayrd Still (July 7, 1906November 19, 1992) was an American historian who taught at New York University (NYU). He also directed the NYU Archives and was a founding member of the New York City Landmarks Preservation Commission from 1962 to 1965.

References 

New York University faculty
1906 births
1992 deaths
20th-century American historians
American male non-fiction writers
20th-century American male writers